Helen Clevenger (November 4, 1917 – July 16, 1936) was an American college student murdered in Asheville, North Carolina on July 16, 1936.

Early life and education

Helen Irene Clevenger was born November 4, 1917, in Washington, DC, to Joseph F. Clevenger and Mary, née Desbach/Dresbach. Both parents were born in Ohio and married in 1902 in Columbus, while they were employed as teachers. Using materials from Ohio Joseph created a study of Phyllachora fungi he  published in 1905 as well as a brief article on using hydrochloric acid to prepare slides. Infants of the Clevengers had died in 1910 and 1915 while they were living in Chicago and then back in Ohio. In between Joseph was a teacher in a college while they lived in Chicago. By 1918 Joseph was visible working from DC with the Pharmacognosy Laboratory of the Department of Chemistry, in the Department of Agriculture, often publishing with Clare Olin Ewing until she left the department in 1919. Joseph registered for WWI draft September 12, 1918, in DC. The Clevengers were living on 5th St NW and he was  employed in the Bureau of Chemistry in the Department of Agriculture. In 1920 the Clevenger family was still there along with three other roomers in 1920. Joseph continued working with the Pharmacognosy Laboratory in DC through 1925. In 1927 Joseph finished a map of the travels of the Báb and Bahá’u’lláh, founders of the Bahá'í Faith, published in volume 2 of The Bahá'í World as approved of by Shoghi Effendi, then head of the religion.

In 1930 the Clevengers owned a home worth $5500 in 1930 dollars, (over $88000 in 2021 dollars) on Howton Ave in the unincorporated town of Great Kills, Staten Island, and he was employed as a scientist with the federal government. By January 1932 Joseph was visible as a pharmacognosist at the New York Station of the Federal Food and Drug Administration in which he continued service into at least 1935.

Clevenger had been raised a member of the Bahá'í Faith, the religion of the family, and graduated from Tottenville High School in 1934. She was a member of the school honors association Arista, editor in chief of the high school Digest and Valedictorian. She was one of 76 students receiving a certificate for participating in high school math competition for New York, and July 1 was announced as one of 39 students awarded scholarships at New York University for the 1936-7 school year. She continued her education at New York University, planning to follow her father as a chemist. The family lived on Howton Ave, on Staten Island.

Death and aftermath
Helen's father said "… for fear I was binding my daughter too much to my life and my ideas, I arranged for her to visit her relatives in North Carolina and travel some with her uncle Billy." She was then in Asheville, North Carolina traveling with her uncle, William Leander Clevenger, 1881-1951, a professor at North Carolina State College. Clevenger's "upturned face was a bloody pulp". Clevenger's death certificate noted she died of a gunshot wound by a .32 caliber bullet through an autopsy while at the Battery Park Hotel with the name Helen I. Clevenger of Great Kills, Staten Island, NY, and died July 16, 1936 around 1am. She was found wearing a Bahá'í ring with the ringstone symbol. Inquiries with the Bahá'ís based on the coverage were noted in New York.

By July 23 press coverage was already significant with reporters phoning or telegraphing stories in across the nation. London papers called about the story and it was reported European papers had the news in their newspapers too. The local police interviewed many witnesses and possible suspects in the killing before finally arresting a relatively-new, 22-year-old negro hotel night janitor, Martin Moore. Moore claimed that he was beaten by detectives into giving a written confession when he was really innocent. Moore was executed in the gas chamber in Raleigh, North Carolina on December 11, 1936.

The sheriff informed newspaper reporters on Sunday August 9 and some had paid for access to the story. The photographer for the newspaper coverage of the confession and re-enactment was the only job he ever did as a photographer. A multi-page review of the case was published in 1942. Her mother died in 1943 after years of medical complications and her father in 1945, retired from the government job about a year.

Dramatizations
Dramatizations were written up in true crime magazines starting in October 1936 including True Detective A version was written and approved of by the sheriff in a radio drama aired in April and July 1937. A 2014 play was written on the incident.

Modern interest
Literature present ghost stories mentions Clevenger haunts where she was killed, the Battery Park Hotel, now Battery Park Apartments since 1996 and up to 2015.

The Asheville "Tourism Center and Free Museum" run by Joshua P. Warren in 2010 had an exhibit on Clevenger as an unsolved murder. Anne Chesky Smith of the University of Georgia has presented in academic circles on the murder, trial, and Moore's execution, in 2016.

The Citizen-Times newspaper of Asheville has referred to the case a few times: 2015 and 2019. So did the New York Daily Times in 2017. There is also speculation it was a case of mistaken identity in 2017, and referred to in another short-fiction contest story. The Southern Mysteries podcast carried the case in 2019, as did history focused review with a point of view on the case, with a third in 2020.

Further reading

References

1917 births
1936 deaths
Deaths by firearm in North Carolina
Murdered American students
People from Great Kills, Staten Island
People murdered in North Carolina
New York University alumni
1936 murders in the United States
Asheville, North Carolina
1936 in North Carolina